Ahmad Ansari Gerashi known as Sheikh Ahmad, was an Iranian merchant, benefactor and international investor. He was born in Gerash, Fars, Iran in 1938 or 1939 and died on 11 September 2016 in Namazi Hospital, Shiraz. He is buried in Doha, Qatar.

References
Sociology of Gerash, published by Abdulali Salahi in Analhagh publications.

1930s births
2016 deaths